Chlorethe lalannecassoui is a species of beetle in the family Cerambycidae. It was described by Dalens, Tavakilian, and Touroult in 2010.

References

Compsocerini
Beetles described in 2010